Conraua derooi is a species of frog in the family Conrauidae. It is found in Togo and Ghana. Common name Togo slippery frog has been coined for this species. Even feared to be extinct, a few populations were found in surveys in 2005–2007, after the species had gone unrecorded for more than 20 years.

Etymology
The specific name derooi honours Antoon De Roo, a Belgian ornithologist who was part of the expedition that discovered the species.

Distribution
Conraua derooi is found in southwestern Togo and adjacent southeastern Ghana on the Togo-Volta Highlands, as well as in the Atewa Range in central Ghana. Records of Conraua alleni from eastern Ghana and Togo refer to this species.

Description
The head is relatively large with prominent eyes and a fairly small snout. The tympanum is not visible externally. The hindlimbs are very long and robust. The toes are long and have distinct adhesive discs and webbing extending midway to the discs. The forelimbs are short but muscular with webbed fingers.

Habitat and conservation
Conraua derooi lives in flowing water in forest habitats; they are permanently aquatic. The tadpoles develop in streams.

At the time of the latest assessment by the International Union for Conservation of Nature (IUCN) in 2004, only one surviving population was believed to exist. However, surveys in 2005–2007 located a few populations in Ghana and Togo, after the species had gone unrecorded for more than 20 years. Nevertheless, the species is extremely threatened by habitat destruction and alteration, as well as by human consumption. Further, there is genetic differentiation between the Atewa and Volta populations. Populations within the Atewa Range Forest Reserve seem large and viable; these are probably the largest remaining populations.

References

derooi
Frogs of Africa
Amphibians of West Africa
EDGE species
Amphibians described in 1972
Taxonomy articles created by Polbot